James P. Aykroyd (1810– July 1835 in Nashville, Tennessee) was an early American composer, arranger, and music educator of piano, organ, and voice in New Bern, North Carolina, Raleigh, North Carolina, and Nashville, Tennessee.  He also owned a general store — first in New Bern, then in Nashville — selling dry goods, groceries, sheet music, and musical instruments – including pianos.  In New Bern, Aykroyd was the organist and choir director at the 1824 dedication of the then newly constructed Christ Episcopal Church.

Music in North Carolina 
In nearly every North Carolina village where there was an academy there was also a music teacher, an art teacher, and sometimes a dancing teacher. In some of these towns, such as New Bern, Raleigh, Greensboro, and Wilmington, there were music teachers independent of academy patronage.  Aykroyd's general store was "One door North of the Bank of Newbern."

Aykroyd, as early as August 11, 1821, advertised in the Newbern Sentinel:

In 1823, Aykroyd, then of New Bern, "respectfully informed the citizens of Hillsboro and its vicinity that he intended giving lessons in music there during the summer months." His terms were "for the Piano, twelve dollars a quarter, for lessons every other week; and three dollars for vocal music, two lessons every other week."

In 1826, Aykroyd posted an announcement in the Raleigh Register:
J. AYKROYD,
PROFESSOR OF MUSIC,
From Newbern
RESPECTFULLY informs the inhabitants of Raleigh, that, agreeably to the purpose which he made known in a former advertisement, he has arrived here and will commence the duties of his profession as soon as a sufficient number of pupils shall be obtained.
A subscription paper is left in the hands of Gen. B. Daniel.
June 7, 1826
— Raleigh Register, June 13, 1826

In Nashville, until his death in 1835, Aykroyd had a large music store on Union Street, near the Union Bank.

Selected compositions 
 The Siren: A Collection of Sacred Music, edited and arranged by James Aykroyd, published by G.E. Blake, Philadelphia (1822) 
 "How Dear to the Heart," sung by Mrs. French, published by G.E. Blake, Philadelphia
Poetry by Stephen Mitchell Chester, Esq. (1793–1862), composed for and dedicated to Miss Mary Taylor
 "Yet Stay Awhile," with variations for the Piano Forte of Harp, published by G.E. Blake, Philadelphia
Composed for and dedicated to Miss Henrietta B. Smith, by J. Aykroyd; the poetry is original
 The American and New Orleans Favorite Waltzes for the Piano Forte, published by G.E. Blake, Philadelphia  
Composed & respectfully dedicated to Miss Caroline Chapman, by J. Aykroyd

From the Thomas Alva Edison Collection of American Sheet, Music Library of the University of Michigan

 The broken vow, or, Theodosius to Constantia: sung by Mrs. French published by G.E. Blake, Philadelphia (1824) 
 The Pirate Lover, sung by Mrs. French, published by G.E. Blake, Philadelphia (1824)   
Poetry by James Gates Percival, music composed and respectfully inscribed to Mrs. J. A. Brown by J. Aykroyd
 The Tell Tale Eye, sung by Mrs. French, published by G.E. Blake, Philadelphia (1824)

Sample sheet music that Aykroyd sold 
Aykroyd used an ink stamp to identify himself as a music dealer on the sheet music he sold.  It read:
Sold by JAMES AYKROYD, Teacher of Music, New Bern. Where are sold, Music and Instruments of every description.

A sample of the sheet music sold and stamp he used is at the Music Library of the University of North Carolina at Chapel Hill; viz: "The Blue Bell of Scotland," with variations for the piano forte or harp (a new edition) by Jean Tatton Latour (1776–1840), published by George E. Blake, Philadelphia

Musical family 
James married Elizabeth Bettner (died 12 March 1869).  James and Elizabeth were married on July 12, 1824, in New Bern, Craven County, North Carolina. Elizabeth was a music teacher in both New Bern and Nashville.  Elizabeth's will was filed July 10, 1869, in Will Book 21, Page 345, Davidson County, Tennessee.

James and Elizabeth Aykroyd had four children, all born in New Bern:

 Julia Blake Aykroyd, (born 21 July 1825; died 28 July 1825 New Bern)
 William James Aykroyd (born 28 July 1827; died 5 November 1832, Nashville) photo of grave marker
 Eliza Jones Aykroyd (born 11 December 1828)
 Maria Caroline Aykroyd (born 20 June 1831)

Eliza Jane McKissack and Maria Caroline Cauthorn (born 20 June 1831, New Bern, North Carolina; died 17 September 1894) taught music.

Maria had married Benjamin F. Cauthorn (born 20 July 1836, Virginia; died 1 June 1902); both were buried at Mount Olivet Cemetery, Nashville, Tennessee.  Maria was a music teacher in Nashville.  Maria's will was filed September 1894 in Will Book 32, Page 438, Davidson County, Tennessee.

Eliza Jane McKissack was the founding head of music (1890) at what now is the University of North Texas College of Music.

Miscellany 
Aykroyd is listed as an 1823 member of the Dialectic Society.

Death 
Aykroyd died in early July 1835 in Nashville "from the effects of laudanum" and was buried July 5, 1935.  The community held a benefit for his children, for which an announcement was posted in the Nashville Banner and Nashville Whig, October 12, 1835.

Notes

References

Works 
 Wolfe, Richard James (born 1928), Secular Music in America 1801–1825, 1st ed. (3 volumes), The New York Public Library (1964); 
 19th-Century American Sheet Music, University of North Carolina at Chapel Hill, Music Library
 Christ Church Parish Records, New Bern, North Carolina

American male composers
1810 births
1835 deaths
People from New Bern, North Carolina
19th-century American composers
19th-century American male musicians